Phaethon is a steel inverted roller coaster at Gyeongju World in South Korea, which opened in 2007. It is South Korea's first inverted roller coaster. It named after the character in Greek mythology.

Track layout 

The coaster starts with a 90 degree turn to the left leading to a 147 ft. lift hill. After coming across the pre-drop, the coaster goes through a drop which spirals 90 degrees to the left, followed by a vertical loop. The next inversion is a zero-g-roll, followed by a cobra roll over the pathway leading to the entrance. After the cobra roll, the riders go through a 360 degree helix over the entrance to the coaster. After the helix comes the first corkscrew followed by another corkscrew, and a 540 degree helix all leading up to the final brakes.

The track layout is similar to Raptor at Cedar Point, except no block brake, and two corkscrews.

References

External links

Roller coasters in South Korea
Roller coasters introduced in 2007
Inverted roller coasters manufactured by Bolliger & Mabillard